Trekse (Greek: Τρέξε) is the title of the ninth studio album by the popular Greek artist Peggy Zina, released on 4 December 2007, by Minos EMI. The album achieved Gold certification from its first week and made entered the Greek Albums Chart at number two.

Track list

Chart performance
The album achieved Gold certification from its first week and entered the Greek Albums Chart at #2, behind Mihalis Hatzigiannis's live album. The album certified platinum in its sixth week on the chart and Zina received the platinum certification on January 22, 2008. In its seventh week, the album disappeared from the chart before re-entering at number 47 and one week later going up to number 27. The album was placed seventh in the IFPI annual albums chart for 2007.

References

2007 albums
Greek-language albums
Peggy Zina albums
Minos EMI albums